Boykambil is a town in the City of Gold Coast, Queensland, Australia. It is within the suburb of Hope Island.

History 
The name is an Bundjalung word. Its meaning is uncertain, referring either to a natural feature of Hope Island, from "buyu-gumma" meaning a broken leg, or "Boggumbil" meaning the Moreton Bay Chestnut (Castanospermum australe).

However, at July 1876 most of the land ( remained unsold.

It was declared a town on 1 March 1968 by the Queensland Place Names Board.

References

External links 

 Town map of Boykambil, 1974

Suburbs of the Gold Coast, Queensland
Towns in Queensland